AK-15 can refer to
 USS Sirius (AK-15), a cargo ship of the United States Navy
 AK-15, a variant of the AK-12 assault rifle chambered for the 7.62×39mm cartridge